In enzymology, a hexose oxidase is an enzyme that catalyzes the chemical reaction

D-glucose + O2  D-glucono-1,5-lactone + H2O2

Thus, the two substrates of this enzyme are D-glucose and O2, whereas its two products are D-glucono-1,5-lactone and H2O2.

This enzyme belongs to the family of oxidoreductases, specifically those acting on the CH-OH group of donor with oxygen as acceptor.  The systematic name of this enzyme class is D-hexose:oxygen 1-oxidoreductase. This enzyme participates in pentose phosphate pathway.  It employs one cofactor, copper.

References

 
 
 

EC 1.1.3
Copper enzymes
Enzymes of unknown structure